Dipogon bifasciatus is a spider wasp from the family Pompilidae.

Description
An all-black species with bifasciate wings, the generic name, Dipogon "two beards", refers to the tufts of forward-pointing bristles on the maxilla of the female, the purpose of which is to pack the nest entrance with old spider silk. Females grow to 5–9 mm in length, and males 4–7 mm.

Distribution
These spider wasps are found in southern Britain through Europe to Russia and on to Japan.  In Europe, the southern limits are in Italy and Bulgaria.

Habitat
Open wooded areas such as forest edge, scrub, orchards and vineyards.  They will use gardens.

Biology
Dipogon bifasciatus hunts crab spiders, of the family Thomisidae, in Britain Xysticus cristatus has been observed as a prey item.  The prey are stored in cells created in old insect burrows dug into rotting wood, hollow stems and cracks in walls, and, unlike many other Pompilid spider wasps, these may be clustered with six cells in each burrow.  A single egg is laid on each paralysed crab spider, smaller spiders host males and larger females.  The nest is made up of sawdust, plant fibres and dismembered insect parts bound together with spider silk and sealed with chewed wood.

References

External links
Images representing Dipogon bifasciatus at Barcodes of Life

Hymenoptera of Europe
Pepsinae
Insects described in 1785